Merl Raymond Eppse (1893 – December 27, 1967) was an African-American historian. He was a History professor at Tennessee State University for three decades, and the author of several books.

Early life
Eppse was born in 1893 in Greenville, Ohio. He graduated from Drake University in 1927, where he earned a bachelor of arts degree in History. He earned a master's degree from the Teachers College, Columbia University in 1935.

Career
Eppse was the dean of Swift Memorial  College in Rogersville, Tennessee, from 1927 to 1928, where he became a professor of History and Geography at Tennessee State University. He later became the department chair. Eppse was the president of the Tennessee Negro Education Association from 1948 to 1949, and he was awarded an honorary doctorate of laws from Wilberforce University in 1953. He retired from TSU in 1960.

Eppse founded National Publication Company in Nashville, Tennessee, to publish his books. He was one of the first educators to write an American History textbook that included the history of African Americans.

Personal life, death and legacy
Eppse married Ruth D. Clemmons. He moved to Los Angeles for his retirement in 1962.

Eppse died on December 27, 1967, in Los Angeles, California. Penn State professor Murry R. Nelson presented a paper on Eppse in 1988. The Tennessee State Library and Archives has a collection of his papers.

Selected works

References

1893 births
1967 deaths
People from Greenville, Ohio
People from Los Angeles
Drake University alumni
Teachers College, Columbia University alumni
Tennessee State University faculty
African-American historians
20th-century American historians
American male non-fiction writers
Historians from Ohio
Historians from California
20th-century American male writers
20th-century African-American writers
African-American male writers